Douglas Brinkley (born December 14, 1960) is an American author, Katherine Tsanoff Brown Chair in Humanities, and professor of history at Rice University. Brinkley is the history commentator for CNN, Presidential Historian for the New York Historical Society, and a contributing editor to the magazine Vanity Fair. He is a public spokesperson on conservation issues. He joined the faculty of Rice University as a professor of history in 2007.

Early life
Brinkley was born in Atlanta, Georgia in 1960, but after his father was transferred to the Toledo, Ohio headquarters of Owens-Illinois in 1969, did his remaining elementary and secondary schooling in Perrysburg, Ohio. His mother was a high school English teacher. In fourth grade Doug memorized the Presidents, their vice presidents, as well as the opposing presidential and vice presidential candidates.

Education
Brinkley was educated at Perrysburg High School, followed by Ohio State University, from which he earned a B.A. (1982), and Georgetown University, earning an M.A. (1983) and Ph.D. (1989) in U.S. diplomatic history.  He has been on the faculty of Hofstra University, the University of New Orleans, Tulane University, and Rice University.

He received an honorary doctorate for his contributions to American letters from Trinity College in Hartford, Connecticut.

Life and career

During his time in Georgetown, Brinkley worked as the night manager at Second Story Books in DC.
During the early 1990s, Brinkley taught American Arts and Politics for Hofstra aboard the Majic Bus, a roving transcontinental classroom, from which emerged the book The Majic Bus: An American Odyssey (1993). In 1993, he left Hofstra to teach at the University of New Orleans, where he taught the class again using two natural-gas fueled buses.  According to the Associated Press, "...if you can't tour the United States yourself, the next best thing is to go along with Douglas Brinkley aboard The Majic Bus."

Brinkley worked closely with his mentor, historian Stephen E. Ambrose, then director of the Eisenhower Center for American Studies at the University of New Orleans. Ambrose chose Brinkley to become director of the Eisenhower Center, a post he held for five years before moving to Tulane University.

Brinkley's first book was Jean Monnet: The Path to European Unity (1992). His second was Dean Acheson: The Cold War Years (1992). He then co-edited a monograph series with Arthur Schlesinger, Jr. and William vanden Heuvel in the 1990s. Brinkley also edited a volume on Dean Acheson and the Making of US Foreign Policy with Paul H. Nitze (1993).  In 1999, he published The Unfinished Presidency about Jimmy Carter's active and influential post-presidency.

Brinkley is the literary executor for his late friend, the journalist and author Hunter S. Thompson. He is also the editor of a three-volume collection of Thompson's letters. Brinkley is also the authorized biographer for Beat generation author Jack Kerouac, having edited Kerouac's diaries as Windblown World (2004).

In 2004, Brinkley released Tour of Duty: John Kerry and the Vietnam War, about U.S. Senator John Kerry's prior military service and anti-war activism during the Vietnam War. The 2004 documentary movie, Going Upriver: The Long War of John Kerry is loosely based on Brinkley's book. Brinkley also wrote the Atlantic Monthly cover story of December 2003 on Kerry.

Brinkley's book The Great Deluge: Hurricane Katrina, New Orleans, and the Mississippi Gulf Coast is a record of the effects of Hurricane Katrina on the Gulf Coast. The book won the 2007 Robert F. Kennedy Book Award and was a Los Angeles Times Book Prize finalist. He also served as the primary historian for Spike Lee's documentary about Hurricane Katrina, When the Levees Broke: A Requiem in Four Acts. Critic Nancy Franklin in The New Yorker noted that Brinkley made up a "large part" of the film's "conscience."

Brinkley's biography of Walter Cronkite, Cronkite was published in 2012. It was also selected as a Washington Post Book of the Year.

Brinkley and Johnny Depp were nominated for a Grammy for their co-authoring of the liner notes to the documentary: Gonzo: The Life and Work of Dr. Hunter S. Thompson. He also co-edited with Johnny Depp the long lost novel of Woody Guthrie titled House of Earth.

In January 2022, Brinkley compared the 2021 United States Capitol attack to the Holocaust, the September 11 attacks, and the Attack on Pearl Harbor. "I think it is like December 7th Pearl Harbor it is like the 9/11 tragedy", said Brinkley.

Congressional hearing 
On November 18, 2011, during his testimony before a Congressional hearing on drilling in the Arctic National Wildlife Refuge, Brinkley had a heated exchange with Rep. Don Young. Young, who had not been present during Brinkley's testimony, nonetheless characterized it as "garbage" and addressed Brinkley as "Dr. Rice." In response, Brinkley stated, "It's Dr. Brinkley. Rice is a university. I know you went to Yuba College and couldn't graduate." Brinkley also noted that Young's comments were made even though Young had not been present during his testimony.

Brinkley continued to argue with Young throughout the hearing until the committee chairman threatened to have Brinkley removed.

Critical reception
Stephen Ambrose called Brinkley "the best of the new generation of American historians." Brinkley and Ambrose had co-authored three books. Patrick Reardon of the Chicago Tribune called Brinkley America's "new past master." In addition, during the 2013 inauguration coverage, CNN referred to him as "a man who knows more about the presidency than just about any human being alive." In contrast, in 2006, historian Wilfred McClay in the New York Sun appraised Brinkley's scholarship as one that has failed to "put forward a single memorable idea, a single original analysis, or a single lapidary phrase." Similarly, author Bill Bryson characterized Brinkley as "a minor American academic and sometime critic whose powers of observation and generosity of spirit would fit comfortably into a proton and still leave room for an echo".

Awards and honors
 In 2023, Brinkley won a Grammy Award for “Fandango At The Wall In New York” by Arturo O’Farrill and The Afro Latin Jazz Orchestra, featuring the Congra Patria Son Jarocho Collective (Grammy Award for Best Latin Jazz Album).  
 In 2022, Brinkley was nominated for two Grammy Award categories; for co-producing two projects: “Black Men Are Precious” by Ethelbert Miller (Grammy Award for Best Spoken Word Poetry Album), and “Fandango At The Wall In New York” by Arturo O’Farrill and The Afro Latin Jazz Orchestra, featuring the Congra Patria Son Jarocho Collective (Grammy Award for Best Latin Jazz Album).  
 In 2021, the Garden Club of America awarded Brinkley the Frances K. Hutchison Medal for his distinguished service to conservation efforts.
 In 2020, Brinkley's book American Moonshot: John F. Kennedy and the Great Space Race was given the Andrew Carnegie Medal for Excellence in Nonfiction (Longlist).
 In 2017, Brinkley was named Presidential Historian for New York Historical Society, helping to advance and articulate the mission, goals, and activities of the Historical Society's Presidency Project.
 In 2017, Brinkley won a Grammy Award Best Large Jazz Ensemble Album for co-producing Presidential Suite: Eight Variations on Freedom by the Ted Nash Big Band.
 In 2016 the U.S. Fish and Wildlife Service awarded him their Heritage Award.
 In 2015 he was awarded the Robin W. Winks Award for Enhancing Public Understanding of National Parks by the National Parks Conservation Association.
 Cronkite (2012), a biography of Walter Cronkite, received the Ann M. Sperber Prize for 2013.
 Wilderness Warrior:  Theodore Roosevelt and the Crusade for America (2009) received the National Outdoor Book Award in the History/Biography category 2009.
 Driven Patriot (1992), a biography of James Forrestal, received the Theodore and Franklin Roosevelt Naval History Prize.
 Brinkley received an honorary doctorate from Hofstra University at commencement in May 2012.
 In 2004, Brinkley was given the Humanist of the Year award by the Louisiana Endowment for the Humanities.
 In 1995 he was awarded the Stuart L. Bernath Lecture Prize from the Society of Historians of American Foreign Relations (Ceremony: Chicago, Illinois, April 1996).

Personal life
Brinkley lives in Austin, Texas.  He and his wife Anne have three children, Johnny, Benton, and Cassady.  He is a member of the Century Association, the Council on Foreign Relations and Society of American Historians.

Works

References

External links

 Douglas Brinkley faculty page at Rice University
 Douglas Brinkley author page at HarperCollins
 Douglas Brinkley author page and articles at American Heritage.
with Douglas Brinkley by Stephen McKiernan, Binghamton University Libraries Center for the Study of the 1960s, September 27, 1997

In Depth interview with Brinkley, December 7, 2003, C-SPAN

21st-century American historians
21st-century American male writers
Writers from Atlanta
Writers from New Orleans
Ohio State University alumni
Rice University faculty
1960 births
Living people
People from Perrysburg, Ohio
Historians from Ohio
Historians from Georgia (U.S. state)
Historians from Louisiana
American male non-fiction writers
Vanity Fair (magazine) people